The letters GSMP may stand for:
 Global standards management process - a system of standards used in international trade
 Ordo Sancti Gilberti Sempringensis (Gilbertines) - an English Catholic religious order